Ronald Smith Billingsley (April 6, 1945 – February 5, 2017) was an American football player, a defensive tackle in the American Football League (AFL) and National Football League (NFL).

Early years
Born in Florence, Alabama, Billingsley was a multi-sport athlete at Gadsden High School in Gadsden and graduated in 1963.  He attended the University of Wyoming in Laramie, where he played college football for the Cowboys under head coach Lloyd Eaton.  Billngsley received notice from AFL scouts during his senior season in 1966, when the Cowboys went 10–1, won the WAC championship, and defeated   in the   He was selected to the All-WAC team as a senior.

Pro football
The San Diego Chargers of the AFL selected Billingsley as the 14th pick of the 1967 NFL/AFL Draft, the first year that the two leagues held a common draft after their merger agreement. He played for the Chargers for four seasons as a defensive starter.  After the 1970 season, he was traded to the Houston Oilers.  After another complete season as a starter at Houston, Billingsley experienced problems with an injury and only played in four games during the 1972 season.  After 1972, he and Kent Nix were traded to the New Orleans Saints for Dave Parks, Tom Stincic, and Edd Hargett.  However, because of the continued problems with his injury, he never played a game with the Saints and retired in 1973.  During his NFL career, the  Billingsley was known for being one of the tallest players in the league.

In the news
On June 15, 2007, Billingsley rescued two fellow residents of his apartment complex in Glencoe, Alabama after one of the units caught fire.

Death
Billingsley died at age 71 in Gadsden in 2017 and was buried at its Crestwood Cemetery.

References

External links

Obituary – Ron Billingsley

1945 births
2017 deaths
Sportspeople from Florence, Alabama
American football defensive tackles
Wyoming Cowboys football players
San Diego Chargers players
Houston Oilers players
Players of American football from Alabama